The spotted spoon-nose eel (Echiophis intertinctus) is an eel in the family Ophichthidae (worm/snake eels). It was described by John Richardson in 1848. It is a marine, tropical eel which is known from the western Atlantic Ocean, including North Carolina, USA, the northern Gulf of Mexico, and Brazil.

References

Ophichthidae
Fish described in 1848
Fish of the Atlantic Ocean